Ahmad Maulana Putra (born 27 July 1988) is an Indonesian professional footballer who plays as a defensive midfielder for Liga 2 club PSKC Cimahi. He was called The Indonesian Marouane Fellaini by his friends because of his similar hairstyle with that Belgian footballer.

Club career

Semen Padang
He was signed for Semen Padang to play in Liga 2 in the 2020 season. This season was suspended on 27 March 2020 due to the COVID-19 pandemic. The season was abandoned and was declared void on 20 January 2021.

Hizbul Wathan FC
In 2021, Ahmad Maulana signed a contract with Indonesian Liga 2 club Hizbul Wathan. He made his league debut on 27 September against Persijap Jepara at the Manahan Stadium, Surakarta.

References

External links

1988 births
Association football defenders
Indonesian footballers
Liga 1 (Indonesia) players
Deltras F.C. players
Indonesian Premier Division players
Persikabo Bogor players
Persires Rengat players
PSMS Medan players
Bali United F.C. players
Sportspeople from Medan
Living people
21st-century Indonesian people